Dendroleon is a genus of antlions in the family Myrmeleontidae. There are more than 20 described species in Dendroleon.

Species
These 21 species belong to the genus Dendroleon:

 Dendroleon amabilis (Gerstaecker, 1885)
 Dendroleon callipterus X. Wan et al., 2004
 Dendroleon dumigani Tillyard, 1916
 Dendroleon esbenpeterseni Miller & Stange in Miller et al., 1999
 Dendroleon falcatus Zhan & X.-I. Wang in Zhan et al., 2012
 Dendroleon javanus Banks, 1914
 Dendroleon kiungaensis New, 1990
 Dendroleon koongarrensis New, 1985
 Dendroleon lii X. Wan et al., 2004
 Dendroleon longicruris (C.-k. Yang, 1986)
 Dendroleon longipennis Esben-Petersen, 1915
 Dendroleon motuoensis Z.-l. Wang & X.-l. Wang, 2008
 Dendroleon obsoletus (Say, 1839) (spotted-winged antlion)
 Dendroleon pantherinus (Fabricius, 1787)
 Dendroleon porteri Stange, 2008
 Dendroleon pupillaris (Gerstaecker, 1894)
 Dendroleon regius (Navás, 1914)
 Dendroleon septemmontanus Statz, 1936
 Dendroleon similis Esben-Petersen, 1923
 Dendroleon speciosus Banks, 1905
 Dendroleon vitripennis (Navás, 1912)

References

Further reading

External links

 

Myrmeleontidae
Articles created by Qbugbot
Myrmeleontidae genera